Kamal Sagar (born 16 July 1969) is an Indian architect, designer, real estate developer, restaurateur, and music enthusiast. Based in Bangalore, India, he is the founder and chairman of Total Environment Building Systems, and founder and chairman, Total Environment Hospitality (Windmills Craftworks).

Early life

Kamal graduated from IIT Kharagpur in 1992, with a degree in Architecture. After a short stint with Omni Architects at Lexington, Kentucky, in the US, he returned to India and designed the Poonawalla Stud Farms at Hadapsar and Theur, Pune, and also built them out in a span of just 8 months, in time for the Asian Racing Conference by Asian Racing Federation on 27 January 1995. At the farms, he extensively used exposed brick masonry, sourced from the state of Kerala, evolving a special technique with the help of steel spacers to bring out the character of every individual brick – in line with his core design philosophy of natural exteriors for all his buildings, to help them blend with the natural landscape. He believed that natural materials had more character, brought the building to life and aged gracefully unlike artificial materials, which did not change with time.

Career

Kamal has moved to Bangalore in 1995, and after working for 4 months with Mansion Architects, started his architectural practice, first in his own name, and then, in the name of Shibanee & Kamal Architects, along with wife and partner, Shibanee In 1996, in his search for a one-bedroom apartment, he realized just how bad the state of large scale housing projects was, and saw tremendous scope to make a difference in this area. After several failed attempts in trying to get Developers to accept his design ideas, he decided to take on the task of developing and constructing his projects himself, and not just designing them. He founded Total Environment, a construction and real estate development company, that would build out his designs without compromise. Total Environment has since, built 2.5 million square feet of high quality, individually customized and furnished space, mostly homes, across Bangalore and Pune. Leading through design and a combination of technology & craftsmanship, each Total Environment home is a sensitively detailed, high-quality space that celebrates nature by embracing it.

Kamal’s work has always been inspired by music and art. He founded Windmills Craft-works, in 2012, a Jazz Theater, Microbrewery and Restaurant, where the audience is able to experience great talent at close quarters, with exceptional sound quality and in a beautiful, warm and comfortable setting and with some of the best beer and food in Bangalore. In less than two years, Windmills Craft-works soon established itself as the best live music venue in Bangalore, bringing path breaking music ranging from Jazz, Blues, rock, folk, Bluegrass, Indian Classical music, Indian folk music and Latin.

Work

Kamal’s work has focused on mostly on creating warm spaces and a high quality experience in high-rise housing projects, through homes that embrace nature. He was surprised to see how people all over the world could build large housing projects where homes did not have gardens – he felt that a garden was a very basic human need.

Kamal introduced the idea of a garden with every home. Referred as Gardens in the Sky. In 1996, at his project Green is the Color, Bangalore, he created gardens cantilevering in alternate directions on consecutive floors. When his customers refused to pay for these gardens, he decided to go ahead and provide them at his own cost.
Over the years, he experimented with various different formats for these gardens, with most rooms in each apartment, opening onto these gardens through large wood frame sliding glass panels.

Kamal also believed that the furniture in a home is integral to the planning and layout of the home and cannot be excluded from the scope of the design of the home and, from 2002, started designing and building most of his homes as completely furnished homes. He also developed a software platform through which he brought design to every single home buyer – a platform that allows a home-buyer to individually customize every detail of his house – from wall layouts and furniture layouts to materials and finishes – down to the detail of the shelving in the wardrobes.

Projects

1995 Poonawalla Stud Farms, Hadpsar, Pune, India
1999 Ion Idea Corporate Campus, Whitefield, Bangalore, India
2000 Bougainvillea, Vibhuthipura, Bangalore, India
2000 Green is the Colour, BTM Layout, Bangalore, India
2001 The Good Earth, Ulsoor, Bangalore, India
2001 Webb India Limited – Corporate Office & workshops, Bommasandra, Bangalore, India
2004 Shine On, Rahath Bagh, Bangalore, India
2004 Time, Indiranagar, Bangalore, India
2006 Footprints, Indiranagar, Bangalore, India
2006 Residence for Navin Dhananjay, Hennur Road, Bangalore, India
2008 Raindrops Keep Falling on my Head, Sarjapur Road, Bangalore, India
2009 Orange Blossom Special, Uday Baugh, Pune, India
2010 Greensleeves, Singasandra, Bangalore, India
2015 Windmills of Your Mind, Whitefield, Bangalore, India
2015 The Magic Faraway Tree, Phase 1, Kanakapura Road, Bangalore, India
2015 Learning to Fly

Awards and recognition

In recognition of his work, Kamal has won several Architectural Design Awards - at both National and International levels  – including the award for the Best Residential Architecture – Asia Pacific Region, and Best Residential Development, India 2009 from CNBC, as well as Most Innovative Design, 2013 from CREDAI Karnataka, for his project Windmills of Your Mind, Habitat Award for Apartment Planning from A+D Spectrum Foundation, for Time, 2005, Best Group Housing Project from JK Cements Architect of the Year Awards and Habitat Award for Apartment Planning, from A+D Spectrum Foundation, 2003, for The Good Earth

References

External links

 Total Environment Jazz Festival
 Total Environment Homes in Bangalore
 Kamal Sagar - Standing out while blending into nature
 Interview: Kamal Sagar, Total Environment, 2013
 Executive Council: Credai Bengaluru
 Nestle in one of India's affordable cities
 Bengaluru beats Paris and all others for me: Kamal Sagar, Total Environment
 I'd raze metro lines & rebuild them with smart design: Kamal Sagar, Total environment building systems CEO

1969 births
Living people
20th-century Indian architects
Indian Institutes of Technology alumni
IIT Kharagpur alumni
Artists from Bangalore